Roman Prodius (born 12 April 1981) is a Moldovan long-distance runner. At the 2012 Summer Olympics, he competed in the Men's marathon, but did not finish.

References

Moldovan male marathon runners
Living people
Olympic athletes of Moldova
Athletes (track and field) at the 2012 Summer Olympics
1981 births
World Athletics Championships athletes for Moldova
European Games competitors for Moldova
Athletes (track and field) at the 2015 European Games
Moldovan male cross country runners
Olympic male marathon runners